Yuma Sammang is the goddess of the Limbu community of Nepal. The deity Yuma Sammang (literally: "Mother Earth" or "Grandmother") also known as Ningwaphuma is the most important and popular among Yakthungs (Limbus) and worshiped in all occasion. Yuma is regarded as the mother by Yakthungs. Yuma Samyo or Yuma religion was very popular during Yet Hang age and Thibong Yakthung (Ten Yakthung) age. After the Khas Aryan oppression in Yakthung laje (Limbuwan), and introduction of Hinduism from Indian mainland majority of Yakthungs had stopped following the Yuma religion for centuries. The Khas-Aryas also gave the term 'Kirata' to the tribes of the Himalayas (mostly eastern tribes). This has in time caused a false belief among sunuwars, yakhas, limbus and the 32 rai tribes that they are all a part of the same ethnic group. In fact, most of these groups are very different from each other, only sharing cultural and lingual similarities because of their close settlements. The Limbus being very distinct from the other so called 'Kiratas' as they do not worship Sumnima and Paruhang. They worship Yuma Sammang on most occasions with the Nembang Clan being an exception as they recognize Theba sammang as their supreme deity. A lot of confusion has occurred since the founding of the Satyahangma Kirat Religion as it states that Sumnima-Paruhang and Yuma-Theba are the same, which is false. The Satyahangma Kirat Religion was created during the reign of the Ranas and it incorporated many Hindu traditions and rituals into the traditional Mundhum of the Limbus. While sharing similar terms [Mundhum{traditional}(Limbu) Mundum(Rai)], the tales within these vocally passed down religions are very different from each other with different characters and events. The lingual difference, cultural difference and various physical traits such as the cranial height and nasal height & breadth also have showed that Limbus and the other so called kiratas are not from the same ancestral family. Studies have also shown that Limbus are more closely related to Tibetans than the rais and sunuwars.

Yakthung community is predominantly an oral culture, and their oral texts is called Mundhum. Mundhum is a collection of diverse narratives or oral rhetorics, such as creation of universe, creation of human beings, animals, plants, and many other elements. In Yakthung culture, they have Mundhum performers, such as Phedangma, Yeba, Yema, Shamba, Samma, and Tutu-Tumyahangs. Despite the Western cultural colonization, influence of Hinduism and other religions such as Buddhism, Christianity, Yakthungs have preserved their culture via their Mundhums. However, as Yakthungs who are affiliated to mainstream politics, bureaucracy, and academic institutions more or less ignored their Yakthung customary practices, Mundhums, and language, including religion—Yuma Samyo. New Yakthung generations started campaigning for the restoration of their culture, language, identity, Mundhum, and religion since 2018.

References

Religion in Nepal